Haiku Tunnel is a 2001 office comedy film about the struggle between temporary and permanent employment.

Plot 
Josh is the consummate temp employee, avoiding all long-term connections and responsibilities, both at work and in his personal life. However, by the time his agency places him at the Schuyler & Mitchell law firm, Josh is tired of his temporary life and agrees to take a permanent position at the firm. Josh has difficulty adapting to his new lifestyle, which manifests in his inability to complete his simple initial task: mailing seventeen important letters.

Cast 
 Josh Kornbluth as himself
 Warren Keith as Bob 'Bob' Shelby
 Amy Resnick as Mindy
 Harry Shearer as Orientation Instructor
 Leah Alperin as Temp #1
 Jacob Kornbluth as Temp #2
 Stephen Muller as Temp #3
 Linda Norton as Temp #4
 Helen Shumaker as Marlina D'Amore
 Sarah Overman as Julie Faustino
 Brian Thorstenson as Clifford
 June Lomena as DaVonne
 Joanne Evangelista as Caryl
 Jennifer Laske as Helen the Ex-Girlfriend
 Patricia Scanlon as Helen the Ex-Secretary
 Joe Bellan as Jimmy the Mail Clerk
 Michael X. Sommers as Crack Attorney

Meaning of the title 
The Haiku Tunnel Project (part of Interstate H-3) is a huge document containing lists of all the products needed for a tunnel in Hawaii. Josh was working in a word processing job when he was given the project. At the time he was "totally-temp" and as he was going through copying this project, he found himself inside the Haiku Tunnel. And now that he finally had what he always wanted (no strings attached) he found himself unhappy.

External links 

 Official site for Haiku Tunnel
 

2001 films
2001 comedy films
Sony Pictures Classics films
Workplace comedies
Films set in San Francisco
Films set in the San Francisco Bay Area
Films shot in San Francisco
2000s English-language films